TALK is the stage name of Nick Durocher, a Canadian indie rock musician best known for his 2022 hit single "Run Away to Mars". 

A native of Ottawa, Durocher has been active in the music business for a number of years, including a stint as a bassist in a country band, but had limited success prior to the early 2020s; out of work, he was forced to move back to his parents' basement in the Ottawa neighbourhood of Stittsville in 2020 during the COVID-19 pandemic. Feeling lonely and depressed, he wrote "Run Away to Mars" overnight after watching the film Interstellar.

He released the song in June 2021 as his debut single, and followed up in November with the EP Talk to Me. "Run Away to Mars" was moderately successful at first, but received a boost in 2022 when it went viral on TikTok, hitting the streaming charts in several countries; by January 2023, the song had reached #1 on Billboard's Adult Alternative charts.

In 2023, he participated in an all-star recording of Serena Ryder's single "What I Wouldn't Do", which was released as a charity single to benefit Kids Help Phone's Feel Out Loud campaign for youth mental health.

References

21st-century Canadian male singers
Canadian rock singers
Canadian indie rock musicians
Musicians from Ottawa
Franco-Ontarian people
Living people